Mulzim is a 1988 Hindi-language action film, produced by G. Hanumantha Rao under the Padmalaya Studios banner, presented by Krishna and directed by K. S. R. Das. It stars Jeetendra, Hema Malini, Shatrughan Sinha, Amrita Singh and Kimi Katkar in lead roles and music composed by Bappi Lahiri. The film is a remake of 1982 Kannada movie Jimmy Gallu which the director of this movie had earlier remade in Telugu as Muddayi (1987).

Plot
Vijay Kumar is a young man living in a small town in rural India, who makes his living farming. He hopes to change his lifestyle and that of the townspeople by building a hospital with the help of attractive young doctor Rekha, who he is in love with, so much so that he is willing to donate his land. Rekha suggests that he approach the District Collector to get permission to build a hospital at another vacant spot, which he does. The Collector assures them that necessary approval will be granted. But the local Zamindar of the region, Ranjit Kumar, has plans of his own, as he intends to build a cinema house for his lover, Sheila. When he faces opposition, he quietly backs away and lets Rekha, Vijay, and the people lay the foundation of the hospital. Thereafter, chaos breaks out in Vijay's life, as he is arrested by the police for killing Sheela. Vijay is tried in court and sentenced to life in prison. Vijay manages to escape so that he can find the real culprits and clear his name, but before he can do that he has to by-pass Jailer Shardadevi and Police Inspector Neeraj Kumar - both of whom have sworn to have him back behind bars in as short a time as possible.

Cast

Jeetendra as Vijay Kumar
Hema Malini as Jailor Sharda Devi
Shatrughan Sinha as Inspector Neeraj Kumar
Amrita Singh as Advocate Mala
Kimi Katkar as Dr. Rekha
Suresh Oberoi as Ranjit Kumar
Kader Khan
Asrani
Bharat Bhushan as Neeraj Kumar's  Father
Urmila Bhatt  Neeraj Kumar's  Mother 
Renu Joshi as Parvati , Mala's Mother

Soundtrack

References

External links

1988 films
1980s Hindi-language films
Indian action films
Films directed by K. S. R. Das
Films scored by Bappi Lahiri
Hindi remakes of Telugu films
Hindi remakes of Kannada films
1988 action films